Coomera Connector, formerly known as the Intra Regional Transport Corridor, is a proposed  motorway that connects Logan City and Gold Coast in South East Queensland, Australia. It will run parallel to the M1 Pacific Motorway for its entire length and will run adjacent to the Gold Coast railway line south of Coomera.

The  Stage 1 of the motorway between Nerang and Coomera will commence construction in 2022 and will be completed in late 2024. The rest of the motorway is currently under planning . As of July 2022 the business case for future stages is due for completion by the end of 2023.

Design
Stage 1 North: between Shipper Drive at Coomera and Helensvale Road at 
Stage 1 Central: between Helensvale Road and Smith Street Motorway at 
Stage 1 South: between Smith Street Motorway and Nerang-Broadbeach Road at Nerang

The motorway is wide enough for six lanes. However, fewer lanes may be built in some sections in the medium-term, depending on transport demand modelling and available construction funding.

The Hope Island railway station of the Gold Coast railway line, which is adjacent to the Coomera Connector, will also be constructed in conjunction with Stage 1.

History

Planning
Since the 1990s, the Coomera Connector corridor has been identified in various public planning documents and Gold Coast planning schemes. A joint 2015 study between the Department of Transport and Main Roads (TMR) and City of Gold Coast confirmed the corridor as a future strategic transport link that will relieve traffic congestion on the M1 Pacific Motorway. The Coomera Connector was also formally declared a future state-controlled road.

The Stage 1 corridor was gazetted in 2016, while the rest of the corridor (northern section) was gazetted between 2017 and 2019.

The preferred route of the northern section was confirmed in April 2021. Residents along the alignment of the northern section had expressed concerns that there was uncertainty of the timeline on when their properties would be acquired and demolished.  residents were also concerned with the impact of the northern section on the Eagleby Wetlands, a flood plain home to birds and reptiles.

Initial community consultation on the Coomera Connector was undertaken in late 2019, with subsequent community consultation of Stage 1 undertaken between 2020 and 2021.

Construction
Early works construction with site investigations were undertaken for Stage 1 in 2021. Main construction will begin in mid-2022.

Funding
The Transport and Main Roads Minister Mark Bailey defended the rising cost to have been caused by "an infrastructure boom".

The state government has also committed  to continue planning for future stages of the Coomera Connector.

References

External links
Commera Connector

Highways in Queensland
South East Queensland